Joe Jones (born 30 September 1944) is a Canadian former cyclist. He competed in the individual road race and the team time trial events at the 1968 Summer Olympics.

References

External links
 

1944 births
Living people
Canadian male cyclists
Olympic cyclists of Canada
Cyclists at the 1968 Summer Olympics
Welsh emigrants to Canada